Jathedar Baba Chet Singh (1914–1968) was a Nihang and was 12th Jathedar of Budha Dal after Baba Sahib Ji Kaladhari. He was born in 1914 at Talwandi. His father's name was Gurdit Singh and mother was Pradhan Kaur. He was succeeded by Jathedar Santa Singh Nihang. He died in 1968 at the age of 54. His memorial is located at Damdama Sahib. Among his famous saying was Fateh Singh Ke Jathe Singh, which he use for Nihang Army.

See also
 Dharam Singh Nihang Singh

References

Nihang
1914 births
1968 deaths